St. John’s Centre is a provincial electoral district for the House of Assembly of Newfoundland and Labrador, Canada. Much of the former district of St. John's Centre was renamed St. John's East in 1996. As of 2011 there were 7,846 eligible voters living within the district.

The district is bounded largely by Columbus Drive to the west, LeMarchant Road to the south, Parade Street to the east and Empire Avenue to the north. The residents are mostly working and middle-class.

Historically voters in the district have elected a member on the government side. A Progressive Conservative bastion for many years after Confederation, and an anti-Confederation area before that, St. John’s Centre shifted Liberal during the Wells and Tobin eras, though by fairly small margins. In 2011, NDP star candidate Gerry Rogers defeated PC cabinet minister Shawn Skinner. She was re-elected in 2015 and became NDP leader in 2018. Rogers retired in 2019 but former Newfoundland and Labrador Teachers’ Association president Jim Dinn held the seat for the NDP. Dinn became interim NDP leader in 2021.

Members of the House of Assembly
The district has elected the following Members of the House of Assembly:

Election results

References

External links 
Website of the Newfoundland and Labrador House of Assembly

Newfoundland and Labrador provincial electoral districts
Politics of St. John's, Newfoundland and Labrador